Effington Township is a township in Otter Tail County, Minnesota, United States. The population was 297 at the 2000 census.

Effington Township was organized in 1872, and its name was selected from a novel.

Geography

Demographics
As of the census of 2000, there were 297 people, 104 households, and 87 families residing in the township.  The population density was 9.0 people per square mile (3.5/km2).  There were 134 housing units at an average density of 4.1/sq mi (1.6/km2).  The racial makeup of the township was 100.00% White.

There were 104 households, out of which 40.4% had children under the age of 18 living with them, 75.0% were married couples living together, 5.8% had a female householder with no husband present, and 15.4% were non-families. 14.4% of all households were made up of individuals, and 6.7% had someone living alone who was 65 years of age or older.  The average household size was 2.86 and the average family size was 3.16.

In the township the population was spread out, with 28.3% under the age of 18, 5.4% from 18 to 24, 24.2% from 25 to 44, 24.9% from 45 to 64, and 17.2% who were 65 years of age or older.  The median age was 40 years. For every 100 females, there were 115.2 males.  For every 100 females age 18 and over, there were 117.3 males.

The median income for a household in the township was $30,000, and the median income for a family was $31,250. Males had a median income of $26,250 versus $24,375 for females. The per capita income for the township was $13,734.  About 7.9% of families and 6.7% of the population were below the poverty line, including 3.1% of those under the age of eighteen and 19.2% of those 65 or over.

References

Townships in Otter Tail County, Minnesota
Townships in Minnesota